Roger Scott Craig is an Irish musician, writer and composer of movies and TV commercials. He is a former member of the Rock bands, Liverpool Express, Fortune, Nina Hagen, Harlan Cage, and 101 South.

Liverpool Express
Roger started his career with The Merseybeats in the early 1970s, along with members, Tony Crane, Derek Cashin, and Tony Coates.
They later left "Tony Crane and The Merseybeats", to form a band called Liverpool Express. Roger invited to come with them, Billy Kinsley whom Roger saw performing in clubs at the time and admired Billy's singing voice.

Liverpool Express experienced chart success with a song "You Are My Love", mentioned by Paul McCartney as one of his favourite love songs, plus "Every Man Must Have A Dream", "Dreamin'", "Hold Tight", and "Smile". They toured the UK and Europe supporting Rod Stewart, and released more hit songs.

Their greatest success came in South America where they scored two consecutive number one hits and they flew over there to tour Brazil in mid 1977. Arriving at Rio de Janeiro Airport, the band were greeted by thousands of hysterical fans.

In early 1978, Prince Charles specifically requested that Liverpool Express perform for him at The Royal Gala Performance to be held at the Empire Theatre in Liverpool. The band were introduced to the Prince and photographed with him after the show.

Fortune/Nina Hagen
Roger left Liverpool behind in 1981 to settle in California, he says he was tired of the cold and rainy weather!  He joined the band Fortune, after auditioning for several bands, including Foreigner. He wanted to be on the West Coast of the US which led to him taking the Fortune job;  and they recorded one album in the mid-eighties. This album had all but one of the songs is written by Roger S. Craig. This album has become something of a cult classic.

After this period he joined Nina Hagen's band, and appeared on her album, In Ekstase. They toured Europe and South America and played for hundreds and thousands of people at the Rock in Rio concert in Brazil. Nina Hagen was not well known in the US, but was very popular in Europe. She went through various keyboard players when Roger quit her band, only to hire him again at a later date.

Harlan Cage
He, along with musician, Larry Greene, formed the band Harlan Cage in the mid-nineties, and they recorded and released successful albums right into the 2000s until a 'Best of' album was commissioned. Roger and Larry formed a very workable group, with Larry's strong and sensual vocals, Harlan Cage became a cult classic which vied with the previous Fortune album for supremacy in the Pomp AOR world.

101 South
Roger later formed a new band, 101 South, in 2000 and they recorded three albums together. 101 South comprises the fulmination of the creativity from all the songs he wrote throughout his life, starting with those songs he wrote for Liverpool Express, Fortune, and Harlan Cage. Roger was able to attract musicians at this point of his career, such as Ian Bairnson (guitarist). His primary choice of vocalist was Gregory Lynn Hall, he had found other musicians who were to his ears specialists in their fields, such as Alan Jeffrey, an emotive saxophone player.

Liverpool Express Reunion
The original line-up of Liverpool Express were reunited in August 2002, followed by global fan interest. This lead Roger to compile and release "The Best of Liverpool Express", which featured a brand new song, a tribute to The Beatles titled "John George Ringo & Paul". A reunion concert in Liverpool shortly followed with Roger appearing on stage with current band members, Billy Kinsley, Kenny Parry, and Dave Goldberg. A year later, Craig and Kinsley met in Liverpool to write and record new material for the album, "Once Upon A Time", which they self-produced.

References

Irish pianists
Musicians from Liverpool
Living people
21st-century pianists
1952 births
The Merseybeats members
Liverpool Express members